Dwarozh School is the only English language public school which is free of charge in Sulaymaniyah Province, Iraq. The school belongs to the Ministry of Education.

Raising Kurdistan flag 
Every Saturday in this gym three students raise the Flag of Kurdistan and the principal with physical education teacher perform the raising of the flag, with performing the Kurdish National Anthem Ey Reqîb, the picture shows raising of the flag at the gym in 2013 and 2014.

History 
In 2010 many students began to attend the school, both from local and international background. in this year, the school also split into two independent schools.
One of the schools is the dwarozh typical school, whose name was recently (2007) changed to Hawcharkh. The typical school is for those students who rank top of their classes, with an average of 85 or above when they pass primary school.
The other school, dwarozh private school, is for those students who come from outside the country, with no regard to their average scores.
Both schools are housed in the same building but attendance times are different for each school.

Current state of the school 
In 2013 the school was renamed "Dwarozh Private School" and have both secondary and preparatory school.. and still attend students from outside and inside Kurdistan, and have many non-Kurdish students (Arabic, English, Persian ... etc.). Later it has been renamed into Dwarozh secondary school, and is now only one school where students from local and foreign background study in the same school

References 

Education in Kurdistan Region (Iraq)
International schools in Iraq
Sulaymaniyah Governorate